José Ruiz Baos "Calatraveño" (5 November 1946 – 25 January 2022) was a Spanish bullfighter. He died on 25 January 2022, at the age of 75.

References

1946 births
2022 deaths
Sportspeople from the Province of Ciudad Real
Spanish bullfighters